Used & Abused: In Live We Trust is the first DVD release by Swedish heavy metal band In Flames, released on 18 June 2005. It was also released in a limited edition two-CD / two-DVD boxset.

DVD disc one

Live at Sticky Fingers – 7 September 2004 (90 minutes)
 "F(r)iend" (Soundtrack to Your Escape)
 "The Quiet Place" (Soundtrack to Your Escape)
 "Dead Alone" (Soundtrack to Your Escape)
 "Touch of Red" (Soundtrack to Your Escape)
 "Like You Better Dead" (Soundtrack to Your Escape)
 "My Sweet Shadow" (Soundtrack to Your Escape)
 "Evil in a Closet" (Soundtrack to Your Escape)
 "In Search for I" (Soundtrack to Your Escape)
 "Borders and Shading" (Soundtrack to Your Escape)
 "Superhero of the Computer Rage" (Soundtrack to Your Escape)
 "Dial 595–Escape" (Soundtrack to Your Escape)
 "Bottled" (Soundtrack to Your Escape)
 "Behind Space" (Lunar Strain)
 "Artifacts of the Black Rain" (The Jester Race)
 "Moonshield" (The Jester Race)
 "Food for the Gods" (Whoracle)
 "Jotun" (Whoracle)
 "Embody the Invisible" (Colony)
 "Colony" (Colony)
 "Pinball Map" (Clayman)
 "Only for the Weak" (Clayman)
 "Trigger" (Reroute to Remain)
 "Cloud Connected" (Reroute to Remain)

Live at Hammersmith, London – 27 December 2004 (40 minutes)
 "Pinball Map" (Clayman)
 "System" (Reroute to Remain)
 "Fuckin' Hostile (Pantera Cover) / Behind Space" (Lunar Strain)
 "Cloud Connected" (Reroute to Remain)
 "In Search for I"  (Soundtrack to Your Escape)
 "The Quiet Place"  (Soundtrack to Your Escape)
 "Trigger" (Reroute to Remain)
 "Touch of Red"  (Soundtrack to Your Escape)
 "My Sweet Shadow" (Soundtrack to Your Escape)

Soundtrack Tour 2004 - Live
 "Only for the Weak" (Clayman)
 "Clayman" (Clayman)

Hidden Bonus Video
 "Episode 666" (Whoracle) Live at Sticky Fingers: To see this video you need to skip to the next chapter while watching "Clayman" from "Soundtrack Tour 2004". Alternately, jump to title 4, chapter 1.

DVD Disc two

Live in Madrid
 "System" (Reroute to Remain)

Live in Australia/Japan
 "Dial 595 - Escape" (Soundtrack to Your Escape)

Soundcheck in London
 "Dial 595 - Escape" (Soundtrack to Your Escape)

Soundcheck in London
 "Touch of Red" (Soundtrack to Your Escape)

Promotional Videos
 "F(r)iend" (Soundtrack to Your Escape)
 "My Sweet Shadow" (Soundtrack to Your Escape)
 "Touch of Red" (Soundtrack to Your Escape)
 "The Quiet Place" (Soundtrack to Your Escape)

Jester TV – Universal Access (50 minutes)
 About In Flames
 Interviews with band members
 About the Metallica show in Madrid
 Behind "The Quiet Place" video shoot
 Behind the "Touch of Red" video shoot
 Other videos: "F(r)iend", "Evil in a Closet"
 About the start of the "Soundtrack" tour 2004
 Summer festival
 "Like You Better Dead" at Metaltown
 About the Japanese Tour
 About the Australian Tour
 L.A. – Roxy
 About the Hammersmith concert
 About the Judas Priest Tour
 666 at Scandinavium
 Backstage tour
 About the Sticky Fingers concert

Hidden bonus video
 "Borders and Shading": To see this video you need to skip to the next chapter while watching "Dial 595 - Escape" from "Videos: Live in Australia/Japan". Alternately, jump to title 8, chapter 1.

Unused footage
During the Hammersmith performance In Flames also performed: "Clayman," "Only For The Weak," and "Episode 666" which are not included on the DVD.

DVD disc three/CD disc one (Live at Hammersmith)
 Pinball Map (4:29)
 System (3:45)
 Behind Space (3:30)
 Cloud Connected (4:41)
 In Search for I (3:33)
 The Quiet Place (3:47)
 Trigger (4:40)
 Touch of Red (3:20)
 My Sweet Shadow (4:34)

DVD disc four/CD disc two (Live at Sticky Fingers)
 F(r)iend (3:26)
 Dead Alone (3:17)
 Like You Better Dead (3:38)
 Evil in a Closet (3:51)
 Borders And Shading (4:06)
 Superhero of the Computer Rage (4:02)
 Dial 595-Escape (3:32)
 Bottled (3:09)
 Artifacts of the Black Rain (3:08)
 Moonshield (4:27)
 Food for the Gods (4:09)
 Jotun (3:36)
 Colony (4:28)
 Only for the Weak (4:52)

In Flames video albums
Nuclear Blast video albums
Nuclear Blast live albums
Live video albums
2005 live albums
2005 video albums